Sugar Lake is a lake in Aitkin County, Minnesota, in the United States.

Sugar Lake was named from the sugar maple trees growing there.

See also
List of lakes in Minnesota

References

Lakes of Minnesota
Lakes of Aitkin County, Minnesota